Blakely is an English and Scottish surname. Notable people with the surname include:

 Allison Blakely, American historian
 Charles Adams Blakely (1879-1950), American admiral
 Colin Blakely (1930–1987), British actor
 Diann Blakely (born 1957), American poet, essayist, and reviewer
 Ebenezer Blakely (1806–1889), New York politician
 Ed Blakely (born 1937), American politician and academic
 John Blakely (born 1947), English pianist
 John Russell Young Blakely (1872-1942), American admiral
 Lara Larramendi Blakely, American politician
 Linc Blakely (1912-1976), American baseball player
 Luke Blakely (born 1988), Antiguan footballer
 Margot Blakely (born 1950), New Zealand alpine skier
 Marqus Blakely (born 1988), American basketball player
 Matthew Blakely, Australian potter
 Mike Blakely, 70, convicted former sheriff of Limestone County, Alabama
 Rachel Blakely (born 1968), Australian actress
 Ross H. Blakely, (1963-1922), American politician
 Sara Blakely (born 1971), American businessperson
 Stuart Blakely (born 1956), New Zealand alpine skier
 Susan Blakely (born 1948), American actress
 William Blakely  (William Faris Blakely) (1875–1941), Australian botanist
 William G. Blakely (1829-1920), American politician
 Zelma Blakely (1921-1978), British artist

See also
 Blakeley (surname)
 Blakley

English-language surnames
Scottish surnames